The Reformed Episcopal Church (REC) is an Anglican church of evangelical Episcopalian heritage. It was founded in 1873 in New York City by George David Cummins, a former bishop of the Protestant Episcopal Church.

The REC is a founding member of the Anglican Church in North America (ACNA), and its four U.S. dioceses are member dioceses of ACNA. The REC and ACNA are not members of the Anglican Communion. The REC is in communion with the Free Church of England, the Church of Nigeria, and the Anglican Province of America.

Due to the death of Royal U. Grote Jr., the then Vice President of the Reformed Episcopal Church, Ray Sutton became the Presiding Bishop of the REC.  At the 55th General Council of the Reformed Episcopal Church in June 2017 in Dallas, Texas, USA, Sutton was elected to be the Presiding Bishop, and David L. Hicks, Bishop Ordinary of the Diocese of the North East and Mid-Atlantic, was elected as Vice-President, of the Reformed Episcopal Church.

As of 2016, the REC reports 108 parishes and missions in the United States and three in Canada, and also has churches in Croatia, Cuba, Germany, and Serbia. In 2009, the Reformed Episcopal Church reported 13,600 members.

History

In the 19th century, as the Oxford Movement urged that the Protestant Episcopal Church and the Church of England return to Anglicanism's roots in pre-Reformation Catholic Christianity, George David Cummins, the Assistant Bishop of the Episcopal Diocese of Kentucky, became concerned about the preservation of Protestant, Evangelical, Reformed, and Confessional principles within the church.

The founding of the Reformed Episcopal Church followed an 1873 controversy about ecumenical activity. In October of that year, Bishop Cummins joined with Dean Smith of Canterbury, William Augustus Muhlenberg, and some non-Anglican ministers at an ecumenical conference of the American branch of the Evangelical Alliance. During the conference, held in New York City, Cummins, Smith and the non-Episcopalian ministers presided at joint services of Holy Communion without using any version of the Book of Common Prayer. Retired missionary bishop, William Tozer, who was visiting New York at the time, criticized Smith and implicitly Cummins for participating in the rite. Tozer's criticism appeared in a letter published by the New York Tribune on October 6, 1873.

Bishop Cummins defended his actions in a letter published 10 days later, but after criticisms from Anglo-Catholic clergy and others for his choice not to seek preaching permission from the bishop in whose diocese he was preaching without authorization (New York), he submitted a letter of resignation to his own bishop on November 10. Three weeks later, joined by 21 Episcopalian clergy and lay people, Cummins organized the first general council of the Reformed Episcopal Church in New York City on December 2, 1873.

Bishop Cummins and his followers considered his action not rash decisions but simply decisive action, founded upon their long-held convictions about the growing Anglo-Catholic practices within the church. While these practices had existed from the founding of the Church of England, the Tractarian or Oxford Movement had been growing in influence, much to Cummins' dismay. He described his understanding's evolution in a letter to Bishop Cheney, stressing his earlier attempts to create reforms within the Protestant Episcopal Church. "We went before the General Conventions of 1868 and 1871 with petitions signed by hundreds of clergymen and laymen from all parts of the land, asking relief for Evangelical men. We asked but three things, the use of an alternate phrase in the baptismal office for infants, the repeal of the canon closing our pulpits against all non-Episcopal clergymen, and the insertion of a note in the Prayer-book, declaring the term "Priest" to be of equivalent meaning with the word Presbyter. We were met by an indignant and almost contemptuous refusal." These failed earlier attempts and Tozer's criticism of the ecumenical communion service Cummins thought an opportunity for decisive action.

Some in the Protestant Episcopal Church saw Cummins' decision as schismatic. Others, however, disagreed. One correspondent of the publication "The Episcopalian" said, "If we say that this new church has begun in schism, the church of Rome alleges the same things against us. The real question is, which party is guilty of the schism, the party which separates and goes out?  or the party that forces the separation, by making binding on the conscience what Christ has not made binding?"  Rather than characterize this as schism, Bishop Cummins and his fellow reformers portrayed themselves as providing a Protestant, Anglican identity under which there could be a 'closer union of all Evangelical Christendom.' "The Reformed Episcopal Church would be what the Protestant Episcopal Church might have become had it not been paralyzed by the Tractarian virus."  The term "Reformed" was never intended to denote any Calvinistic sense of Reformed theology, but was intended to convey Cummins' purpose of an Episcopal Church that had been reformed against Catholic influences [the founders of the church would often stylise the name as The Re-Formed Episcopal Church, for disambiguation so that it was known this was the Episcopal Church Re-Formed and not of a reformed theology].  Bishop Cummins was in attendance at a Convention on 21 October 1868 and was greatly disappointed by the "Catholic" practices which he witnessed: "[a]ltars erected, with super-altars, with burning candles, and floating clouds of incense; the communion service set in a Roman framework ... there is a departure from the doctrinal basis of the Reformation."  Cummins' feelings grew stronger after reading an essay titled "Are There Romanising Germs in the Prayer Book?" which asserted that the Romanisation of the church and the Holy Eucharistic service was not an influence from the outside but, rather came from inside the church – it was in the Prayer Book itself, thus; Cummins started pushing stronger against the "Roman germs" which sadly, caused him to lose friends on both sides: Anglo-Catholics and Evangelicals alike.

The REC has had several periods of a general distinct theology. Although it began as a way to preserve Protestantism within the Anglican identity, the Anglican aspect of the identity began to fade over time. With its growing and heavy emphasis on ecumenical relations with other Protestants, many of those who converted or were confirmed in the REC had identities from various other Protestant backgrounds. Due to this influx and the short-lived bishopric of the founders, the typical Reformed Episcopalian went from a Protestant, Latitudinarian pathos to a more Dispensationalist persuasion in a relatively short period of time, much of this happening in the early 1900s. Over the following several decades, the REC made the transition to more Reformed theology in the Calvinistic sense. It was not until the 1970s that the Presiding Bishop, Leonard Riches, pushed for the revitalization of Anglican theology and identity in the REC.

Early growth

In the United States
Within six months of its founding in 1873, the REC grew to about 1,500 communicants, two bishops and 15 other ministers. In 1875, over 500 African-American Protestant Episcopal communicants in South Carolina's Low Country joined the REC as a group.

In Canada
Within a year from the founding of the REC, like-minded Canadian Anglicans in New Brunswick and Ontario seceded from that Church and formed Reformed Episcopal congregations. In October 1874, Edward Cridge, dean of the Anglican cathedral in Victoria, British Columbia, withdrew with about 350 of his congregation to form the Church of Our Lord
and join the Reformed Episcopal Church. Cridge was consecrated a bishop for the REC in 1876. Many of the Canadian Reformed Episcopal Churches joined the United Church at its founding. The Reformed Episcopal Church now has three churches in Canada, two in British Columbia and one in Ontario. St. George's Church, Hamilton is affiliated with the Diocese of the Northeast in the US, and both Holy Trinity Church in Colwood and Living Word in Courtenay are a part of the Diocese of Western Canada and Alaska.

In England
In 1877, in response to a petition from REC sympathizers in England, the REC's Fifth General Council acted to establish the Reformed Episcopal Church in that country.  Former Church of England minister Thomas Huband Gregg was consecrated a bishop to lead adherents there. By 1910 there were 28 ministers and 1,990 communicant members constituting the Reformed Episcopal Church in that country.  In 1927, the Reformed Episcopal Church in England merged with the Free Church of England.

Developments since 2000

Eastern Canada diocese merged
In 2009, Bishop Michael Fedechko retired as ordinary of the Diocese of Central and Eastern Canada, and the diocese's parishes came under the supervision of the Diocese of the Northeast and Mid-Atlantic. Bishop Fedechko subsequently became affiliated with the Independent Anglican Church Canada Synod.

Revised Book of Common Prayer
Revised editions of the REC Book of Common Prayer were issued in 2003 and 2005 (see below).

Current status

The Reformed Episcopal Church reported that it had 13,600 members in 2009.

Dioceses

United States
The Reformed Episcopal Church was originally divided into four synods. The synods were renamed dioceses in 1984. As of 2016, there are four U.S. dioceses with 108 parishes and missions:

 The Diocese of the Central States, founded in 2008, achieved full diocesan status in 2011. It has 20 parishes and missions in seven states and is led by Peter Manto.
 The Diocese of the Northeast and Mid-Atlantic, with the Convocation of Eastern Canada, created from the original New York and Philadelphia Synod, has 28 parishes and missions in Maryland, Massachusetts, New Jersey, New York, Pennsylvania, and Ontario, led by R. Charles Gillin.
 The Diocese of Mid-America, with the Convocation of the West and Western Canada, was created from the original Synod of Chicago, and has 31 parishes and missions. The diocese is led by Ray Sutton, who is also the presiding bishop. It  was previously led by the late Royal U. Grote Jr., with the Coadjutor being Ray Sutton. The Assisting Bishop for Canada and Cuba is Charles Dorrington.
 The Diocese of the Southeast, created from the early formed Charleston-Charlotte and Atlanta Synod, with 32 parishes and missions in South Carolina and Georgia, led by Willie J. Hill Jr.

From 2008 to 2016 an additional U.S. Diocese of the West existed. It had been formed as a Missionary Diocese from the Diocese of Mid-America and attained full diocesan status when churches from the Anglican Province of America joined the REC in 2008, led by Winfield Mott. In April 2016, the diocesan synod voted to dissolve the diocese due to its small size and merge with ACNA's Missionary Diocese of All Saints.
The Diocese of Western Canada and Alaska, created in 1996, had two parishes in British Columbia, led by Charles Dorrington, and also included the Missionary District of Cuba. Due to his small size, the diocese was extinct and incorporated in the Diocese of Mid-America as the Convocation of the West and Western Canada, of which Charles Dorrington is an Assisting Bishop.

Other countries
 The Missionary Diocese of Cuba, with over 30 parishes and missions, is under the supervision of Bishop Charles Dorrington, with Willians Mendez Suarez as Suffragan Bishop.
 The Protestant Reformed Christian Church in Croatia has three parishes and two missions in Croatia. It became the jurisdiction of the REC in 2011. The PRCC was founded in 2001 when several parishes left the Reformed Christian Church in Croatia.
 In Germany, one of three expressions of the Anglican Church in Germany called "Anglikanische Kirche in Deutschland" or "Reformierte Episkopalkirche".  It has ten congregations and missions. The Bishop Ordinary is Gerhard Meyer. The other two expressions, which (in contrast) belong to the Anglican Communion, are the Diocese of Europe of the Church of England and the Convocation of Episcopal Churches in Europe from the USA.

Relations with other jurisdictions

Formation of Anglican Church in North America

In 2009, the REC became a founding member of the Anglican Church in North America (ACNA), a denomination seeking to create a new Anglican Communion province distinct from the Episcopal Church. ACNA is in communion with the Anglican Churches of Uganda, Nigeria and Sudan, with approximately 30 million members worldwide, representing approximately one-third of the faithful of the Anglican Communion.

Earlier developments
The REC in North America has been in full communion with the Free Church of England since 1927, when Reformed Episcopal congregations and clergy in England merged with the FCE. Bishops of the two churches take part in episcopal consecrations of the other, and there are periodic visits between them. On occasion REC clergy have served in FCE parishes and vice versa. As of 2018, there are two FCE dioceses in England and one diocese in South America.

In 1998 the REC signed a concordat of intercommunion for the first time with an Anglo-Catholic communion, the Anglican Province of America (APA).  A 2005 renewal of the agreement also established intercommunion with the Anglican Communion's Church of Nigeria.
This agreement of intercommunion between Reformed Episcopal Church and Church of Nigeria (Anglican Communion) gives privilege for Church of Nigeria Priests in diaspora to be licensed and practice in any jurisdiction of REC. Recently in 2018 NEMA-REC accepted and licensed priests who are immigrants in the United States.

An additional proposal would have led to an eventual merger between the APA and the REC, but the APA's decision not to join the new Anglican Church in North America in 2008 is an obstacle to the proposed merger.

Slavery and emancipation

George David Cummins 
George David Cummins, the founding bishop of the REC, was the son of a slaveholder. Cummins' view of slavery maintained there was nothing inherently sinful about slave-holding and that the practice, in and of itself, was never condemned in Scripture as being an abomination to God or harmful to mankind. He qualified this statement with certain opinions pertaining to the practice. According to Cummins the African-American slave is "of one blood with ourselves, a sharer in common humanity, a partaker of our hopes and fear." Although Cummins was not anti-slavery, his view of slavery and the African-American differed drastically from that of many of his contemporaries. This attitude did not compel him to endorse emancipation, however, it did convince him of a kind of paternalism. Cummins charged slaveholders to be more responsible and caring of their slaves: "The Anglo-American [is] the tutelar guardian of the African," adding that it is the responsibility of white Americans "to regard the African race in bondage as a solemn trust committed to these people from God, and that He has given this great mission of working out His purposes and mercy and love towards them." Cummins may have seen slavery as something that ought to train and discipline those in bondage as preparation for starting their own country/continent. Cummins was not an emancipationist, but was of the mind that freed slaves should return to Africa and create a livelihood for themselves.

Ordination of black clergy
Following the passing of the Thirteenth Amendment to the United States Constitution, black churches with black clergy and officiates sought inclusion into various dioceses and denominations. While some dioceses of the Episcopal Church were more open to the inclusion of black congregations, there were many dioceses who, as a collective whole, disowned and rejected blacks from the Episcopal communion. Frank C. Ferguson, a former slave and a minister of a black congregation, experienced such discrimination. This ultimately led his congregation, and four others, to leave the Protestant Episcopal Church and move to the REC. Despite his earlier comments on slavery and emancipation, Bishop Cummins gladly welcomed black congregations and clergy into the REC. By doing so, Cummins had scored an important moral point by rising above the "color line" and making the REC's declarations about openness and liberty more than theological vocabulary. Of course, Cummins had not imagined that either he or the REC would become pioneers of racial justice, and in the 1870s he faced as much reluctance from Northern whites in his own General Council as from South Carolina whites in their diocesan convention. But Cummins could not square his own dreams of ecumenicity with racial exclusivism. The Reformed Episcopal Seminary itself is one of the first, if not the first, seminaries to be racially inclusive.

Doctrine

Founding principles
The founders of the Reformed Episcopal Church professed a faith rooted in the English Reformation, regarding the Holy Scripture as the Word of God, and accepting the authority of the Nicene, Apostles' and Athanasian Creeds, the first four ecumenical councils, the Thirty-nine Articles of Religion (in the form published in 1801 by the Protestant Episcopal Church), and the Declaration of Principles of the Reformed Episcopal Church.

They emphasized the Protestant, Reformed, Evangelical and Reformational aspects in the history of the Church of England, making frequent allusions to Archbishop Cranmer, Bishop Ridley, Bishop Hugh Latimer, Bishop John Hooper, Archbishop Matthew Parker, Bishop John Jewel, Archbishop Edmund Grindal and other Reformers in the Church of England. Early leaders of the Church, in lectures and sermons, warned against Ritualism as a denominational proclivity in the Episcopal Church.

Concluding the final day of the First General Convention of The Reformed Episcopal Church, December 2, 1873, the principles and ethos were summarized:

"One in heart and in faith with our fathers, who at the very beginning of this nation sought to mold and fashion the ecclesiastical polity which they had inherited from the Reformed Church of England, by a judicious and thorough revision of the Book of Common Prayer, we return to their positions and claim to be the old and true Protestant Episcopalians of the days immediately succeeding the American Revolution, and through these, our ancestors, we claim an unbroken historical connection through the Church of England, with the Church of Christ, from the earliest Christian community."

Declaration of Principles
The first general council of the REC approved this declaration on 2 December 1873:

1. The Reformed Episcopal Church, holding "the faith once delivered unto the saints", declares its belief in the Holy Scriptures of the Old and New Testaments as the Word of God, as the sole rule of Faith and Practice; in the Creed "commonly called the Apostles' Creed;" in the Divine institution of the Sacraments of Baptism and the Lord's Supper; and in the doctrines of grace substantially as they are set forth in the Thirty-Nine Articles of Religion.

2. This Church recognizes and adheres to Episcopacy, not as of Divine right, but as a very ancient and desirable form of Church polity.

3. This Church, retaining a liturgy which shall not be imperative or repressive of freedom in prayer, accepts The Book of Common Prayer, as it was revised, proposed, and recommended for use by the General Convention of the Protestant Episcopal Church, A.D. 1785, reserving full liberty to alter, abridge, enlarge, and amend the same, as may seem most conducive to the edification of the people, "provided that the substance of the faith be kept entire."

4. This Church condemns and rejects the following erroneous and strange doctrines as contrary to God's Word: First, that the Church of Christ exists only in one order or form of ecclesiastical polity; Second, that Christian Ministers are "priests" in another sense than that in which all believers are a "royal priesthood"; Third, that the Lord's Table is an altar on which the oblation of the Body and Blood of Christ is offered anew to the Father; Fourth, that the Presence of Christ in the Lord's Supper is a presence in the elements of Bread and Wine; Fifth, that regeneration is inseparably connected with Baptism.

Doctrine on Baptism
The term regeneration has been used differently throughout the church's history, and the objection of the Reformed Episcopal Church's founders was based on the definition of the "new birth" then current amongst Evangelicals. If regeneration is an instantaneous work of the Spirit quickening the heart prior to conversion, a gift from God given only to His elect, then the language of baptismal regeneration would suggest that all the baptized are finally saved. It is for this reason that the Declaration of Principles denies that regeneration is inseparably connected with baptism. This of course has been an important issue for the REC since its founding. According to Guelzo, in his book, "For the Union of Evangelical Christendom" Cummins said, "the regeneration for which we thank God in baptism is not to be taken in any sense as descriptive of the renewing work of the Holy Spirit upon the heart, but only a term equivalent to baptism, a sacramental change, a change of covenant relation."

Doctrine on ministry
The Reformed Episcopal Church, according to its own Book of Common Prayer, holds that from Apostolic times, there have been three orders of ministry: Bishops, Presbyters and deacons.

Bishops
In a letter to a Protestant Episcopal cleric Bishop George Cummins wrote that the role of a bishop was an "office" of service not a "monarchialist order" contending that  "the Episcopate is not of apostolic origin; that the Bishop is only primus inter pares, and not in any way superior in order to the Presbyter. We are acting on this principle. We set apart a Bishop to his work by a joint laying on of hands of a Bishop and the presbyters. I act as a Bishop, not claiming a jure divino right, or to be in any Apostolic Succession, but only as one chosen of his brethren to have the oversight. If others look upon me as retaining the succession, that does not commit us to their understanding."

According to the church's early founders, bishops were "presiding presbyters, not diocesan Prelates". Mason Gallagher, one founding minister, argued that the true episcopate had come through the 1785 line of evangelicals. In his view, the Protestant Episcopal Church had changed its principles and thereby lost any claim to valid episcopacy when it adopted the 1789 Book of Common Prayer containing a "Scoto-Romish Communion service and a thoroughly Sacerdotal Institution Office", and when it created a House of Bishops with power to overrule the existing House of presbyters and laymen: "If there is such a thing as the Historic Episcopate, and it is of any value, the parties making this offer in the present case cannot deliver the goods."

Bishops preside over Baptism, Eucharist, and Ministry of the Church, "they are primarily the sign of unity in the church" <J. Robert Wright, on being a Bishop: Paper on Episcopacy from the Moscow Consultation 1992. (New York: The Church Hymnal Co. 1993), Pg.52.>

Ministers
At its founding in 1873, the REC designated its clergy as presbyters, pastors, and ministers, but not as "priests", and the word "priest" was expunged from the REC's Book of Common Prayer in favor of the word "minister".  This usage reflected the terminology used in the Cranmerian 1552 Book of Common Prayer.

Acceptance of other Evangelical clergy
REC ministers, like ministers of the Protestant Episcopal Church, exchanged pulpits with evangelical ministers of non-episcopal traditions. They viewed the ministries of the word and sacraments in other evangelical denominations as equally valid. True churches of Christ existed outside episcopal church structures, they held, contrary to Tractarian and High Church teaching. Inter-evangelical collegiality was an important issue for the REC, because Bishop Cummins had been censured for participation with Presbyterian and Methodist ministers in an inter-church communion service. This practice of the founders' praxis and belief has now been abandoned. The current praxis is to require reordination and regularization of orders if ordained outside episcopal ordination.

At its first general council on December 2, 1873, the REC also reformed the transfer of clergy credentials from other denominations. In the Episcopal Church, such transfers had involved a process of application, examination, reception, and in some cases, conferral of holy orders, understood as a "regularization". In contrast, the REC allowed for examination in points of doctrine and discipline for validation of conformity yet without reordination.

Contemporary positions and controversies

Theological diversity
Although the REC was founded as an evangelical and Reformed Anglican body, it now has Anglo-Catholics among its members and has entered into an intercommunion agreement with an Anglo-Catholic body, the APA.  A 2006 document of the REC bishops, "True Unity by the Cross of Christ",  grants wider flexibility to re-interpret the Thirty-nine Articles in an Anglo-Catholic manner while maintaining the perspective of the English Reformers. It uses the terms "priest", "altar", and "Real Presence", and speaks of the authority of tradition as well as that of Holy Scripture.

Reformed critics characterize these developments as rejecting the 35 Articles, revising the force of the Declaration of Principles, as well as departing from the Church's evangelical and Reformed heritage in order to accommodate Anglo-Catholicism.

Role of women in ministry
The church does not ordain women as bishops, presbyters, or deacons. In 2002, the denomination approved a canon that provides for the "setting apart" of qualified women as deaconesses who are not considered by the church to be ordained. While they are not considered ordained they do have important functions within the ministry of the church. Canon 22 states, "The duty of the Deaconess is to assist the Minister in the care of the poor and sick, the religious training of the young and others, and the work of moral reformation." Deaconesses in the Reformed Episcopal Church may have liturgical responsibilities; however they do not have eucharistic responsibilities beyond that allowed to any other member of the laity.
Some conservative Anglicans, especially those within the Continuing Anglican churches, have criticized the REC for uniting with the Anglican Church in North America (ACNA) since certain ACNA dioceses ordain women to Holy Orders. While only a few dioceses ordain women to the priesthood, there are more that ordain women to the diaconate.

Clergy transfers
Under the current canons of the Reformed Episcopal Church, a non-REC minister entering into the REC ministry as a deacon or presbyter is to receive Holy Orders if he has not already been ordained by a bishop recognized by REC as in the historic succession. If previously ordained in a non-episcopal church, the applicant to the REC may need to be regularized.

Book of Common Prayer

1873 edition
The founding First General Council of the REC approved a Book of Common Prayer for the church, with a text based on the proposed 1785 BCP prepared by William Smith and William White (later the first Episcopal Bishop of Pennsylvania).

This text, published in 1786, had been offered to the First General Convention at Philadelphia held in 1785.  Although initially authorized in some states, its changes met with considerable resistance, and the Episcopal Church adopted a different text in 1789 as its Book of Common Prayer.

In accord with prevailing Evangelical preferences and in opposition to Tractarianism, the 1873 REC Council made various changes in order "to eliminate from the Prayer-Book the germs of Romish error, which the compromises of the Elizabethan era have transmitted to us." Cummins and other Evangelicals concerned about the influx of Anglo-Catholic Ritualism had been impressed by a tract, published by Frank S. Rising in 1868, entitled: "Are There Romanizing Germs in the Prayerbook?" The adoption of Bishop White's Book was an attempt to remove those portions of the BCP which were or could be made objectionable to the Evangelical conscience. The REC Book replaced the word "priest" with "minister" throughout, dropped saints' days from the calendar, and struck from the Apostles' Creed the words "He descended into hell". From the service of Holy Communion expressions such as "holy mysteries" and "eating the flesh and drinking the blood" were removed. References to baptismal regeneration were modified in accordance with evangelical views, as were the services of Ordination and Marriage. In 1875, the Third General Council of the REC voted to append to the prayerbook 35 Articles of Religion (modelled after the original 39 Articles of the English prayerbook, but further defining the church in opposition to Ritualism).

Later editions
The REC Book of Common Prayer was updated in 1930 and 1963, and incorporated elements of the 1928 BCP of the Protestant Episcopal Church, while retaining the Evangelical distinctions of the REC.

The Reformed Episcopal Church began a process of historical return, theological transformation and liturgical revision in the 1990s with the first revised BCP for trial use being produced in 1999.  The 49th and 50th General Councils of the REC approved a revision of the Book of Common Prayer to be based on the Church of England's 1662 Book of Common Prayer, with elements drawn from several later Books (PECUSA 1928 and 1945, REC 1963, Australia 1978). The revised version was issued in 2003. with a subsequent update in 2005.

Seminaries
The Reformed Episcopal Church has three seminaries, operating at four sites.

Reformed Episcopal Seminary

The Theological Seminary of the Reformed Episcopal Church, otherwise known as Reformed Episcopal Seminary, is the largest and oldest of the seminaries of the Reformed Episcopal Church and is accredited by the Association of Theological Schools. It began offering classes in 1886 in West Philadelphia and was chartered in 1887. Now located in Blue Bell, Pennsylvania, it offers Master of Divinity (M.Div.), a Certificate in Bible and Theology, and a Licentiate in Diaconal or Deaconess Ministry.

The Reformed Episcopal Seminary has been at its current location for 17 years and recently acquired the building across the lot for additional classroom space and to house the book store.  The new classroom space is being used for the language lab and some of the Old Testament Theology classes, the Bishop Nicholson classroom.  The Main Campus building has also expanded classroom space this year by adding an additional classroom upstairs, the Bishop Rudolph classroom.  Also, the library has been growing in volumes exponentially from generous donations.  The expansive collection spans the main floor as well as the basement now.

Cummins Seminary
Cummins Memorial Theological Seminary, located in Summerville, South Carolina, near Charleston, is named for Bishop George Cummins, the founder of the Reformed Episcopal Church. The seminary which is conservative, evangelical, biblical and Anglican was founded in the latter part of the nineteenth century as a rogative college, meaning it was located wherever the Bishop of the Southeast took up residence. Colonel Stevens from the Citadel was the first bishop. The founding bishop was Bishop David Cummins. In 1912, the Diocese of the Southeast purchased a property for a permanent campus. Its motto is to "enter to learn and depart to serve". Its purpose is to equip generations of Church leaders for excellence in ministry and service with the theological foundation and skills to meet the spiritual, emotional and physical needs of communities through the Gospel of Jesus Christ.

The seminary offers residential programs leading to the degrees Bachelor of Theology and Master of Divinity, and the Certificate in Theological Studies. The Seminary formerly offered distance education through an External Studies Department. In 2016, Cummins President Dr. Julius Barnes appointed to the faculty the noted theologian John G. Panagiotou.

Cranmer House
Cranmer Theological House was founded in 1994 in Shreveport, Louisiana, and is named for the English reformer, Thomas Cranmer, Archbishop of Canterbury. With courses offered in Katy, Texas, just west of Houston, as well as in Dallas, Cranmer House offers residential and distance learning programs for people not seeking ordination, a certificate in Anglican Studies, a Master of Arts in Religion (MAR), Master of Divinity (M.Div.), and Master of Theology (Th.M.). A Deaconess Studies program was added to the 2009–2010 academic catalog.

See also
List of bishops of the Reformed Episcopal Church
Anglican Church in North America
Federation of Anglican Churches in the Americas
Anglican Province of America
Free Church of England
Continuing Anglican movement

References

Bibliography
 Acker, Keith J., Susanne Barrett, and Alice Acker. Book of Common Prayer 2011: And Administration of the Sacraments, Other Rites, and Ceremonies of the Church Together with the Form and Manner of Making, Ordaining and Consecrating Bishops, Priests, and Deacons: Together with the Psalter. San Diego, CA: Lava Rock Media, 2011.
 Free Church of England. Constitution and Canons Ecclesiastical. [Place of publication not identified]: [publisher not identified], 1983.
 Holy Trinity Reformed Episcopal Church (Charleston, S.C.). Historic Holy Trinity Reformed Episcopal Church One Hundred and Fifteenth Church Anniversary, 1875-1990: Sunday July 1, 1990, 4:00 Pm, 51 Bull Street, Charleston, South Carolina ; Rev. Fred Garnett, Paster [Sic]. [Charleston, S.C.]: [Holy Trinity Reformed Episcopal Church], 1990.
 Reformed Episcopal Church. Book of Common Praise. Anglican House Pub Inc, 2018. .
 Reformed Episcopal Church. The Book of Common Prayer: And Administration of the Sacraments and Other Rites and Ceremonies of the Church, According to the Use of the Reformed Episcopal Church in North America, Together with the Psalter or Psalms of David. [Philadelphia, Pa.?]: [Publication Society of the Reformed Episcopal Church?], 2005.
 Reformed Episcopal Church. The Reformed Episcopal Church: What Is It? Philadelphia, Pa: Reformed Episcopal Publication Society, 1950.
 Reformed Episcopal Church in Canada. St. Bartholomew (Montréal, Québec). Québec, Ile-De-Montréal, Montréal, Church Records. [Sainte-Foy, Québec]: Archives nationales du Québec, 1986. Notes: Images numériques des originals in the Archives nationales du Québec at Sainte-Foy, Québec. These records were created by the clergy to be turned in as part of civil registration in Québec. Contains baptisms, marriages and burials with some volumes indexed, 1878–1882.

External links

 
 The Reformed Episcopal Church Board of Foreign Missions
 Historical documents on the Reformed Episcopal Church from Project Canterbury
 1963 Reformed Episcopal Book of Common Prayer
 2003 Reformed Episcopal Book of Common Prayer
 2005 Reformed Episcopal Book of Common Prayer
 The REC Order of Deaconesses
 Profile of the Reformed Episcopal Church on the Association of Religion Data Archives website
 Following the Light, by George David Cummins

Resources from earlier years of the REC and concerns of a former Reformed Episcopalian:
 Traditional REC Resources

Seminaries:
 Cranmer Theological House
 Cummins Memorial Theological Seminary
 Reformed Episcopal Seminary

 
Reformed denominations in the United States
Reformed denominations in Canada
Anglicanism in Canada
Anglicanism in the United States
Religious organizations established in 1873
Anglican Church in North America
Anglican denominations in North America
Anglican realignment
Anglican organizations established in the 19th century
Protestant denominations established in the 19th century
1873 establishments in New York (state)
Evangelical denominations in North America